The Piano Sonata in G major D. 894, Op. 78 by Franz Schubert is a sonata for solo piano, completed in October 1826. The work is sometimes called the "Fantasie", a title which the publisher Tobias Haslinger, rather than Schubert, gave to the first movement of the work. It was the last of Schubert's sonatas published during his lifetime, and was later described by Robert Schumann as the "most perfect in form and conception" of any of Schubert's sonatas. A typical performance runs approximately 35 minutes.

Movements

The sonata consists of four movements:

Mood and character
The English pianist and Schubert specialist Imogen Cooper has described the G major sonata as "one of the rare completely serene sonatas that he wrote," adding, "Of course, as ever with him, there are contrasting passages which become stormy and a little bit dark, but the overall mood is one of peace and luminosity, in a way that the G Major string quartet, written a few months before, was most definitely not". She noted further that "the last movement has tremendous wit in it — and one or two moments of great poignancy, as if a cloud suddenly covered the sun, and then the sun comes out again".

The third movement's opening theme is remarkably similar to the second theme of the first movement of Schubert's second Piano Trio both in rhythm and note progression.

Peter Pesic commented on Donald Francis Tovey's observation that Schubert used a "circle of sixths" series of key signatures in the fourth movement of this sonata, in the sequence G → E → B = C → G = A.

Pianists Sviatoslav Richter and Paul Lewis stated that this was their favourite Schubert sonata. The former is notable for his extremely slow interpretation of the first movement, and solemn account of the work, making the whole sonata usually last over 45 minutes in total.

References

External links
 Recording by Serg van Gennip
 

Piano sonatas by Franz Schubert
1826 compositions
Compositions in G major